FC Nuuk  is a Greenlandic football club based in the capital of Nuuk. Founded in 2021, the team plays in the Greenlandic Football Championship.

History
FC Nuuk entered the Greenlandic Football Championship for the first time in 2021, but the season was eventually abandoned because of the COVID-19 pandemic after FC Nuuk played only a single match. The following season the full schedule was played, but the club did not make it out of the qualifying group stage against the other clubs from Nuuk.

Domestic history
Key

References

Football clubs in Greenland
Association football clubs established in 2021
Nuuk